Wayne Mervin Hatswell (born 8 February 1975) is an English former professional footballer and current assistant head coach at Walsall.

Playing career
Born in Swindon, Hatswell began his career with Swindon Supermarine and also played for Witney Town and Cinderford Town before joining Frank Gregan at Forest Green Rovers in 1999. During his first season at Forest Green, he made 34 league appearances, and two in the FA Cup scoring two goals. During his next season at Forest Green, he played a further 23 games, scoring five goals. At Forest Green, he became famous for scoring one of the worst ever own goals, when his attempted clearance went straight into his own net during an FA Cup match against Morecambe. The own goal became a favourite of former England striker and television presenter Gary Lineker who regularly featured the goal on BBC Match of the Day. However, Hatswell's form in the league was brilliant and earned him a move to Oxford United for £35,000. The move came on 1 December 2000, and at Oxford, he made 52 appearances, failing to score. At the end of the 2002 season, he moved to Chester City on a free transfer. He had a successful spell with Chester, playing 42 times and scoring three times in 17 months, before another move came. This time to Kidderminster Harriers for £8,000.

Within weeks of arriving at Aggborough manager Jan Molby made him the club captain, a role that he performed well. Following that award he was rewarded with a three-year contract but then in the year that Kidderminster got relegated he had a very poor season by his standards and was put on the transfer list. When he failed to find a new club during the close season he found he still had a job to do at the Harriers.

He eventually left the club in January 2006 in a cost-cutting exercise. He joined Rushden for an un-disclosed fee, believed to be about £10,000. He made his debut for Rushden & Diamonds in an away match against Stockport County. The match ended 2–2, but both teams needed a win as they were both threatened by relegation. He scored his first goal for Rushden in an away match at Bury, scoring a free kick from 40 yards out. He ended the season a regular at Rushden, but could not prevent their relegation from the Football League. He remained an active member of the first team during the 2006–07 season, his only goal coming against Stevenage Borough, for whom he scored an own goal during the same match. At the end of the season he was offered a new one-year contract, which he signed.

On 18 January 2008, he joined Cambridge United for £20,000.

In January 2010, he joined Dundalk as a player-coach. Dundalk manager Ian Foster commented on Hatswell's arrival to Dundalk saying; "Wayne is a player who leads by example both on and off the pitch. His leadership qualities are well recognised by the fact that he has been captain at most of his previous clubs. Wayne has operated coaching schools for Arsenal in his home town of Swindon, and has acquired all the necessary coaching badges. I expect Wayne to make a big impact at Dundalk both on the playing pitch and the training ground." Hatswell has been deployed mainly at left-back for Dundalk and his experience has been vital both on and off the pitch. On 2 July 2010, he scored in UEFA Europa League match against CS Grevenmacher of Luxembourg. Dundalk exited the Europa League qualifying at round two to an 8–0 aggregate defeat at the hands of Levski Sofia. Pride had somewhat been restored however as Dundalk suffered an unlucky 2–0 defeat in the return leg at Oriel Park on 22 July 2010 having lost 6–0 in Sofia in the first leg on 15 July 2010.

On 26 December 2010, Dundalk announced Hatswell had left the club by mutual consent and on 28 December 2010 Hatswell had joined Newport County in a player-coach role. He was a part of the Newport side that reached the 2012 FA Trophy Final at Wembley but left the club at the end of the season.

In the summer of 2012, Hatswell joined Conference North club Brackley Town but left before the turn of the year to try his hand at management. He also spent time with Cinderford Town when he left Forest Green Rovers

Coaching and managerial career
On 3 January 2013, Hatswell was appointed as manager of Stamford of the Northern Premier League Division One South. Stamford won the 2012–13 playoff final earning promotion to the Northern Premier League Premier Division. Two weeks after winning promotion Hatswell resigned to take up a coaching position at newly promoted League Two club Newport County where he had been a player in the 2011–12 season.

On 7 February 2015, with Newport County in sixth place in League Two, manager Justin Edinburgh was appointed manager at League One Gillingham. Jimmy Dack stepped up to manager at Newport County assisted by Hatswell until the end of the 2014–15 season. Dack left Newport in April 2015 and Hatswell was subsequently released by the club in May 2015 following the appointment of Terry Butcher as team manager.

On 6 July 2015, Gillingham announced the appointment of Hatswell as the League One club's youth team manager, teaming up with Justin Edinburgh once again. On 9 March 2017, Hatswell rejoined Newport County as Assistant Manager to Caretaker Manager Michael Flynn following the sacking of team manager Graham Westley. Flynn resigned after nine league matches of the 2021–22 season with Newport 15th in League Two with Hatswell appointed as Newport County caretaker manager. Hatswell managed Newport for four unbeaten League Two matches before the appointment of James Rowberry as Newport manager on 19 October 2021 with Newport 13th in League Two after 13 matches of the 2021–22 season.  Hatswell was retained as assistant manager to Rowberry and he signed a contract extension in November 2021 until the end of the 2023–24 season. On 21 February 2022, Newport announced the departure of Hatswell after he had expressed a strong desire to pursue a new opportunity away from the club. On 22 February 2022, Hatswell was appointed assistant head coach to Michael Flynn at Walsall.

Managerial statistics

References

External links

1975 births
Living people
Swindon Supermarine F.C. players
Forest Green Rovers F.C. players
Oxford United F.C. players
Chester City F.C. players
Kidderminster Harriers F.C. players
Dundalk F.C. players
Newport County A.F.C. players
Brackley Town F.C. players
Sportspeople from Swindon
English Football League players
Association football defenders
English footballers
National League (English football) players
England semi-pro international footballers
Rushden & Diamonds F.C. players
Witney Town F.C. players
Cambridge United F.C. players
Stamford A.F.C. managers
Gillingham F.C. non-playing staff
Newport County A.F.C. non-playing staff
Newport County A.F.C. managers
English Football League managers